Hutcheon is a surname which may refer to: 

David Hutcheon, Canadian municipal politician
Duncan Selby Hutcheon (1879–1954), Canadian provincial politician
Ernest Hutcheon (1889–1937), Australian cricketer and Olympic athlete
Jack Hutcheon (1882–1957), Australian cricketer and barrister
Linda Hutcheon (born 1947), Canadian postmodern theorist
Michael Hutcheon, Canadian medical doctor and author
Paul Hutcheon, Scottish political journalist